Tan Cheng Han  is a Singaporean lawyer and legal academic. Until 2012, he was the dean of the National University of Singapore Faculty of Law, where he taught contract law and company Law and directed the EW Barker Centre for Law & Business. From 2019 to 2022, he was the dean of the City University of Hong Kong School of Law and the chair professor of commercial law. He is also a consultant at TSMP Law Corporation. In August 2012, he was appointed the inaugural chairman of Singapore's new Media Literacy Council.

Tan graduated with a Bachelor of Laws in 1987 and  then obtained his Master of Laws from the University of Cambridge in 1990. He also practices as an advocate specialising in complicated commercial disputes and is a member of the Singapore International Arbitration Centre's Regional Panel of Arbitrators. Tan was appointed Senior Counsel in 2004 at the age of 39, and together with fellow Andrew Phang, became the first academics to be so appointed. Prior to joining NUS in 1996, Tan was a partner in Drew & Napier's litigation department.

Tan's current public appointments include being Chairman of the Singapore Media Literacy Council, Chairman of the Advisory Committee on Move-On and Filming Orders, Advisor to the Singapore Tae Kwon-do Federation, a Commissioner of the Competition Commission of Singapore, a member of the Appeal Advisory Panel to the Singapore Minister for Finance, a member of the Military Court of Appeal in Singapore and a member of the Governing Board of the International Association of Law Schools.

In 2004, Tan was one of three Singaporeans who were chosen out of a pool of 8,000 candidates worldwide to be part of The Forum of Young Global Leaders, a forum which was created by Klaus Schwab, executive chairman of the World Economic Forum. In 2005, Tan was also named by the Straits Times as one of "50 young Singaporeans to watch".

In August 2006, Tan was appointed to the Subordinate Courts' Bench as a new specialist judge to preside over the Informatics case. He was also awarded the Public Administration Medal (Silver) at Singapore's 41st National Day celebrations.

References

External links

Academic staff of the National University of Singapore Faculty of Law
Catholic Junior College alumni
Living people
20th-century Singaporean lawyers
Singaporean people of Chinese descent
Singaporean Senior Counsel
National University of Singapore alumni
Saint Joseph's Institution, Singapore alumni
Recipients of the Pingat Pentadbiran Awam
Year of birth missing (living people)
Law school deans
21st-century Singaporean lawyers